Ripley Township, Indiana may refer to one of the following places:

 Ripley Township, Montgomery County, Indiana
 Ripley Township, Rush County, Indiana

Not to be confused with: Riley Township, Vigo County, Indiana

See also 

Ripley Township (disambiguation)

Indiana township disambiguation pages